Excession is a 1996 science fiction  novel by Scottish writer Iain M. Banks. It is the fifth in the Culture series, a series of ten science fiction novels which feature a utopian fictional interstellar society called the Culture. It concerns the response of the Culture and other interstellar societies to an unprecedented alien artifact, the Excession of the title.

The book is largely about the response of the Culture's Minds (benevolent AIs with enormous intellectual and physical capabilities and distinctive personalities) to the Excession itself and the way in which another society, the Affront, whose systematic brutality horrifies the Culture, tries to use the Excession to increase its power. As in Banks' other Culture novels the main themes are the moral dilemmas that confront a hyperpower and how biological characters find ways to give their lives meaning in a post-scarcity society that is presided over by benign super-intelligent machines. The book features a large collection of Culture ship names, some of which give subtle clues about the roles these ships' Minds play in the story. In terms of style, the book is also notable for the way in which many important conversations between Minds resemble email messages complete with headers.

Plot summary 
The Excession of the title is a perfect black-body sphere that appears mysteriously on the edge of Culture space, appearing to be older than the Universe itself and that resists the attempts of the Culture and technologically equivalent societies (notably the Zetetic Elench) to probe it. The Interesting Times Gang (ITG), an informal group of Minds loosely connected with Special Circumstances, try to manage the Culture's response to the Excession. The Affront, a rapidly expanding race which practises systematic sadism towards subject species and its own females and junior males, also try to exploit the Excession by infiltrating a store of mothballed Culture warships and using them to claim control of the mysterious object.

The Sleeper Service, an Eccentric General Systems Vehicle (GSV) who had nominally left the Culture, is instructed to head to the location of the Excession by the ITG. As a condition the Sleeper Service demands that Genar-Hofoen, a human member of Contact, attend it to seek a resolution with his ex-lover, Dajeil, who lives in solitude on the GSV. They had had an intense love-affair and, after a series of sex changes, had each become impregnated by the other until Genar-Hofoen was unfaithful and Dajeil attacked Genar-Hofoen, killing the unborn child. Dajeil then suspended her pregnancy and withdrew from society for 40 years and the Sleeper Service hopes to effect a reconciliation between them.

As the stolen Affront fleet approaches the Excession, the Sleeper Service deploys a fleet of 80,000 remote controlled warships, in a misguided attempt to neutralize the threat. It transpires that the Affront have been manipulated into their grab for power by members of the ITG who thought it was morally imperative to curb the Affront's cruelty by any means, and intend to use the Affront's theft of Culture warships as an excuse for war. The Excession releases a wave of destructive energy towards the Sleeper Service. In desperation, the Sleeper Service transmits a complete copy of its personality, its "Mindstate", into the Excession, which has the effect of halting the attack. The Excession then vanishes as mysteriously as it appeared and the brief war with the Affront is halted.

During these events, and after speaking with Genar-Hofoen, Dajeil decides to complete her pregnancy and remain on the Sleeper Service, which sets course for a satellite galaxy. Genar-Hofoen returns to the Affront, having been rewarded by being physically transformed into a member of the Affront species (whose company he finds more stimulating than that of the Culture's people).

The book's epilogue reveals that the Excession is a sentient entity that was acting as a bridge for a procession of beings that travel between universes. It also assesses whether the species and societies it encounters are suitable to be enlightened about some unknown further existence beyond the universe; as a result of events in the story the Excession concludes that the civilisations it has encountered in this universe are not yet ready. It also takes the name given to it by the Culture – The Excession – as its own – in an oblique reference to the aforementioned Affront species, who had been named by another species in an attempt to label them as a lost cause of hyper-sadistic freaks.

Outside Context Problem

This novel is about how the Culture deals with an Outside Context Problem (OCP), the kind of problem "most civilizations would encounter just once, and which they tended to encounter rather in the same way a sentence encountered a full stop."

This is a problem that is "outside the context" as it is generally not considered until it occurs, and the capacity to actually conceive of or consider the OCP in the first place may not be possible or very limited (i.e., the majority of the group's population may not have the knowledge or ability to realize that the OCP can arise, or assume it is extremely unlikely). An example of OCP is an event in which a civilization does not consider the possibility that a much more technologically advanced society can exist, and then encounters one. The term is coined by Banks for the purpose of this novel, and described as follows:

Banks has noted that he spent much time playing the Civilization computer game (appearing to refer to the first version of the game series) before writing the book and that it was one of the inspirations for the concept of the 'Outside Context Problem' central to the novel. In an interview, Banks specifically compares this to having a Civilization battleship arrive while the player is still using wooden sailing ships.

Literary significance and criticism

Banks' view of the Culture
The book, more than any of the other Culture novels, focuses on the Culture's Minds as protagonists.

When asked about his focus on the possibilities of technology in fiction, Banks said about the book:

The book shows a number of Minds acting in a decidedly non-benevolent way, somewhat qualifying the godlike incorruptibility and benevolence they are ascribed in other Culture novels. Banks himself has described the actions of some of the Minds in the novel as akin to "barbarian kings presented with the promise of gold in the hills."

Reviews
Kirkus Reviews described the book as "Brilliantly inventive and amusing – whole sections read like strings of knowing jokes – but a mess: Chattering spaceships with splendid if confusing names [...] don't compensate for the absence of real characters." A few who praised it commented that Excessions complexity and frequent use of in-jokes make it advisable for new readers of Banks' Culture stories to start with other books. In a retrospective of Excession at Tor, Peter Tieryas writes, "There are literally paragraphs thrown in as background detail that could make for amazing novels of their own. Part of the joy of Excession is hearing the Minds speak with each other, that matrix-like shower of numbers, text, esoteric syntax, and witty repartee."

Reviewed in Arcane Magazine with a 10/10 rating, the novel was an "astounding achievement," regarded as "huge in scope, intricate in detail, swaying from pathos to metaphysics and from humour to light-speed action," with Banks considered, "a science-fiction writer truly without equal at the moment."

References

External links
Links to reviews of Banks' works, including Excession

1996 British novels
1996 science fiction novels
Anarchist fiction
The Culture
Novels by Iain M. Banks
Orbit Books books
Smart drugs in fiction
Space opera novels